Yanqing Town is a town situated on the west side of Yanqing District, Beijing, China. It borders Zhangshanying Town in its north, Shenjiaying Town in its east, as well as Dayushu and Kangzhuang Towns in its south. Additionally, it contains Rulin, Xiangshuiyuan and Baiquan Subdistricts within it, and has two exclaves south of Baiquan. In 2020, Its population was determined to be 54,790.

The town's name had been Longqing during the early Ming dynasty. In 1567, to avoid the name taboo of Longqing Emperor, the region was renamed Yanqing.

Geography 
Yanqing Town is situated at the both shores of Guishui River. China National Highway 110 and Datong–Qinhuangdao railway both traverse through the town.

History

Administrative divisions 
At the end of 2021, Yanqing Town was made up of the following 45 villages:

See also 

 List of township-level divisions of Beijing

References 

Yanqing District
Towns in Beijing